Abrigada is a former civil parish, located in the municipality of Alenquer, in western Portugal. In 2013, the parish merged into the new parish Abrigada e Cabanas de Torres. It covers 39.23 km² in area, with 3416 inhabitants as of 2001.

References

Former parishes of Alenquer, Portugal